The 2nd New Orleans Infantry Regiment was a regiment in the Union Army during the American Civil War.

The regiment was established at New Orleans, Louisiana, in early 1864, and was on garrison and guard duty in the New Orleans defenses. It operated at Calcasieu Pass between May 6 and 10. The unit was disbanded on August 4, its organization incomplete, and its men transferred to the 1st New Orleans Infantry Regiment.

See also

List of Louisiana Union Civil War units

References

New Orleans Infantry, 002
Louisiana New Orleans Infantry, 002
Military units and formations established in 1864
1864 establishments in Louisiana
Military units and formations disestablished in 1864
1864 disestablishments in the Confederate States of America